Kurwai Assembly constituency is one of the 230 Vidhan Sabha (Legislative Assembly) constituencies of Madhya Pradesh state in central India. This constituency came into existence in 1957, as one of the Vidhan Sabha constituencies of Madhya Pradesh state. This constituency is reserved for the candidates belonging to the Scheduled castes since 1977, following the delimitation of the Legislative Assembly constituencies.

Overview

Kurwai (constituency number 146) is one of the 5 Vidhan Sabha constituencies located in Vidisha district. This constituency presently covers the entire Kurwai tehsil of the district with 224 villages, Sironj tehsil's 116 villages and Basoda tehsil's 94 villages. It has total 264 polling booths. Total Voters in the constituency are 1,98,965.

Kurwai is part of Sagar Lok Sabha constituency along with seven other Vidhan Sabha segments namely Sironj and Shamshabad in Vidisha district and Bina, Khurai, Surkhi, Naryoli and Sagar in Sagar district.

Members of the Legislative Assembly
 1957: Takhatmal, Indian National Congress
 1962: Takhtamal Lunkaram, Indian National Congress
 1967: K. Kumar, Bharatiya Jana Sangh
 1972: Awadh Narayan, Bharatiya Jana Sangh
 1977: Ram Charan Lal, JNP
 1980: Panbai, Indian National Congress (I)
 1985: Shyamlal Shankarlal, Bharatiya Janata Party
 1990: Shyam Lal, Bharatiya Janata Party
 1993: Chironjilal Sonkar, Bharatiya Janata Party
 1998: Raghuveer Singh, Indian National Congress (I)
 2003: Shyamlal Panthi, Bharatiya Janata Party
 2008: Hari Singh Sapre, Bharatiya Janata Party
 2013: Veer Singh Panwar, Bharatiya Janata Party

See also
Vidisha district

References 

Sagar district
Assembly constituencies of Madhya Pradesh